John Glass may refer to:

John Glass (administrator), acting Superintendent of Penang while Francis Light was attending to other duties
John M. Glass (1843–1925), mayor and chief of police
John P. Glass (1821–1868), speaker of the Pennsylvania House of Representatives
John Judah Glass (1897–1973), Canadian politician
John Glass (footballer) (1908–1991), Scottish footballer